Bob Bryan and Mike Bryan were the defending champions.  They successfully defended their title, defeating Jonathan Erlich and Andy Ram 7–6(7–5), 3–6, [10–7] in the final.

Seeds

Draw

Draw

External links
Draw

2007 ATP Tour